Sara Vivienne Weller  (born August 1961) is a British businesswoman, Non-executive Director of BT Group plc, a NED of Virgin Money plc and a NED of The Money & Pensions Service, and was the CEO of the retail chain Argos from 2004 to 2011.

Career 
Sara Weller CBE is a Non-executive Director of BT Group plc, a NED of Virgin Money plc and a NED of The Money & Pensions Service. She is a former Non-executive Director of Lloyds Banking Group plc and United Utilities plc. As an executive, Sara was Managing Director of Argos for 7 years, and on the plc Board at J Sainsbury. She has also worked in Whitehall as the Lead Non Executive on two Government Department Boards, DWP and DCLG (now MHCLG).

From 2015 to 2017, Weller was Chair of the Planning Inspectorate Board.

In 2015, she was appointed a CBE for public service.

As of April 2017, she is the lead non-executive director of the Department of Work and Pensions.

Weller has been a non-executive director of BT Group since July 2020.

References

1961 births
Living people
Place of birth missing (living people)
Commanders of the Order of the British Empire
Lloyds Banking Group people
British chief executives